Renilde Silva Bulhões Barros (born 30 March 1947) is a Brazilian physician and politician who is currently a Senator for the state of Alagoas. She took office on 3 April 2019 after Fernando Collor de Mello took a 120-day leave. Before being elected, she was mayor of Santana do Ipanema from 2005 to 2012.

She is married to Isnaldo Bulhões, the current mayor of Santana do Ipanema, and was his Secretary of Government before taking office as Senator.

References

1947 births
Living people
People from Santana do Ipanema
21st-century Brazilian women politicians
Members of the Federal Senate (Brazil)
Women mayors of places in Brazil
Republican Party of the Social Order politicians